Little Tonoloway Creek is a  tributary of Tonoloway Creek in Fulton County, Pennsylvania in the United States.

Another Little Tonoloway Creek exists just  to the south in Maryland, flowing directly into the Potomac River at Hancock.

See also
List of rivers of Pennsylvania

References

Rivers of Pennsylvania
Rivers of Fulton County, Pennsylvania
Tributaries of the Potomac River